Big Time Wrestling (also known as NWA Detroit) was a professional wrestling promotion headquartered in Detroit, Michigan in the United States.

History
Professional wrestling debuted in Detroit in the 1920s when Nick Londos began promoting events in the Detroit Olympia. Londos was succeeded by Adam Weissmueller, then by Louis Markowitz. By the 1930s, multiple promoters were competing in the territory.

In the aftermath of World War II, Weissmueller's former assistant Harry Light established the Harry Light Wrestling Office as a vehicle for promoting professional wrestling in Detroit and secured the rights to promote events at the Arena Gardens. In 1948, Light founded the National Wrestling Alliance along with Al Haft, Paul "Pinkie" George, Orville Brown, Sam Muchnick, and Tony Stecher. The six promoters agreed to divide the United States into regional territories within which they would not compete with one another and to recognise a single World Heavyweight Champion who would travel the country wrestling in each territory. By the 1950s, Light - along with his business partners Jack Britton and Bert Ruby - controlled professional wrestling in Detroit and Big Time Wrestling on WXYZ-TV Channel 7 was one of the most popular programs airing in Detroit.

In 1959, Jim Barnett and Johnny Doyle (supported by backers such as Frank Tunney) formed a holding company, the Barnett-Doyle Corporation, and began promoting in Detroit, buying-out Light. Barnett and Doyle were originally "outlaw" promoters but the territory later rejoined the National Wrestling Alliance.

In 1964, professional wrestler Ed "The Sheik" Farhat and his father-in-law Francis Fleser acquired the promotion (along with the rights to promote wrestling in the Cobo Arena) from Barnett and Doyle for $50,000, controlling it through "World Wide Sports" (a holding company they created). Farhat booked himself as the promotion's top wrestler, winning its top championship NWA United States Heavyweight Championship (Detroit version) 12 times. By the 1960s, the promotion was airing two to three television programs per week and staging weekly house shows at the Cobo Arena. The promotion's TV program was unique in that it would occasionally air local collegiate wrestling matches alongside worked angles, in a segment called "Am-Pro Wrestling".

In the early-1970s, the promotion faced competition from Dick the Bruiser and Wilbur Snyder's newly-established All Star Championship Wrestling, which sourced its talent from the Indianapolis, Indiana-based World Wrestling Association. After several wrestlers defected to ASCW, Big Time Wrestling brought in talent from other NWA territories. However, ASCW ceased operations in 1974, and Dick the Bruiser joined Big Time Wrestling—even facing The Sheik in a series of brawls. During the 1970s, Big Time Wrestling helped popularize hardcore wrestling.

The promotion's fortunes began to decline in the mid-1970s due to a combination of the 1973–75 recession, "no-shows" by its wrestlers, and the fanbase tiring of its predictable and formulaic booking. As house show audiences dwindled, events were re-located to ever-smaller venues (from the Cobo Arena to the Michigan State Fairgrounds Coliseum, and then to the Lincoln Park Community Center outside of Detroit). The promotion went out of business in 1980.

Big Time Wrestling was the subject of the 1985 mockumentary I Like to Hurt People. Professional wrestling in Detroit remained subdued until the World Wrestling Federation began promoting in the city as part of the 1980s professional wrestling boom.

Championships

Alumni
 Abdullah the Butcher
 Arnold Skaaland
 Bobo Brazil
 Killer Tim Brooks
 Haystacks Calhoun
 George Cannon
 Leaping Larry Chene 
 Ripper Collins
 Al Costello
 Bull Curry
 Fred Curry
 Dick the Bruiser
 Irish Mickey Doyle
 Dominic DeNucci
 Pampero Firpo
 Dory Funk Jr. 
 Terry Funk 
 Gino Hernandez
 Professor Hiro
 Ben Justice
 Killer Kowalski
 Ernie Ladd
 Lord Athol Layton (announcer)
 Mark Lewin 
 Magnificent Zulu 
 Tony Marino
 Luis Martinez
 Tex McKenzie
 Sam Menacker (announcer)
 Mighty Igor
 Dusty Rhodes
 Ernie Roth (announcer) 
 The Sheik
 Ray St. Clair
 Hans Schmidt (wrestler)
 George Steele
 The Stomper
 Johnny Valentine
 Fritz Von Erich
 Kojika
 Baron Fritz von Rashke
 Rocky Johnson (frequent tag team partner of Ben Justice)
 The California Hell's Angels
 Thunderbolt Patterson
 "Iron Mike" Loren
 Guy Mitchell "The (other) Stomper"
 Murray Cummings

Footnotes

External links
 Big Time Wrestling at WrestlingTitles.com
 

 
1945 establishments in Michigan
1980 disestablishments in Michigan